The following is a list of notable Polish lawyers.

A

 Karol d'Abancourt de Franqueville (1851–1913)
 Joanna Agacka-Indecka (1964–2010)

B

 Oswald Balzer (1858–1933)
 Juliusz Bardach (1914–2010)
 Norbert Barlicki (1880–1941)
 Alfred Biłyk (1889–1939)
 Józef Buzek (1873–1836)

C

 Henryk Cederbaum (1863–1928)
 Józef Chaciński (1889–1954)
 Krystyna Chojnicka (born 1951)
 Wiesław Chrzanowski (born 1923)
 Zbigniew Ćwiąkalski (born 1950)
 Paweł Czartoryski
 Andrzej Czuma (born 1938)
 Czesław Czypicki (1855–1926)

D

 Włodzimierz Dąbrowski (1892–1942)
 Janusz Dobrosz (1924–1999)
 Robert Draba (born 1970)
 Mirosław Drzewiecki (born 1956)

F
 Leon Feiner (1885–1945)

G

 Lech Gardocki (born 1944)
 Roman Giertych (born 1971)
 Stanisław Głąbiński (1862–1941)
 Michał Grażyński (1890–1965)
 Andrzej Kusionowicz Grodyński (1861–1925)
 Stanisław Sylwester Alfonzy Grodyński (1898–1971)
 Bartłomiej Groicki (c. 1534–1605)
 Mieczysław Witold Gutkowski (1893–1943)

I
 Stanisław Iwanicki (born 1951)

J
 Marian Jedlicki (1899–1954)

K

 Janusz Kaczmarek (born 1961)
 Jarosław Kaczyński (born 1949)
 Lech Kaczyński (1949–2010)
 Zygmunt Kałużyński (1918–2004)
 Franciszek Kasparek (1844–1903)
 Leon Kieres (born 1948)
 Janusz Kochanowski (1940–2010)
 Kazimierz Konopka (1769–1805 or 1809)
 Stefan Korboński (1901–1989)
 Edward Kossoy (1913–2012)
 Andrzej Kotula (1822–1891)
 Izaak Kramsztyk (1814–1899)
 Stanisław Krasiński (1585–1649)
 Andrzej Kremer (1961–2010)
 Jan Kucharzewski (1876–1952)
 Krzysztof Kwiatkowski (born 1971)

L

 Raphael Lemkin (1900–1958)
 Roman Longchamps de Bérier (1883–1941)
 Feliks Łubieński (1758–1848)
 Zdzisław Lubomirski (1865–1943)

M

 Godzimir Małachowski (1852–1908)
 Franciszek Malewski (1800–1870)
 Andrzej Marcinkowski (1929–2010)
 Stanisław Michalkiewicz (born 1947)
 Władysław Michejda (1876–1937)
 Jakob Monau (1546–1603)
 Marion Mushkat (1909–1995)

N
 Bonawentura Niemojowski (1787–1835)

O

 Jan Olszewski (born 1930)
 Antoni Osuchowski (1849–1928)

P

 Ryszard Pacławski (born 1958)
 Kazimierz Papée (1889–1979)
 Stanisław Patek (1886–1944)
 Krzysztof Piesiewicz (born 1945)
 Maciej Płażyński (1958–2010)
 Wiktor Poliszczuk (1925–2008)
 Leopold Innocenty Nepomucen Polzer (1697–1753)
 Krzysztof Pusz (born 1951)

R

 Emil Stanisław Rappaport (1877–1965)
 Cyryl Ratajski (1875–1942)
 Adam Redzik (born 1977)
 Jan Rokita (born 1959)
 Walery Roman (1877–1952)
 Henryk Rossman (1896–1937)
 Andrzej Rzepliński (born 1949)

S

 Eustachy Stanisław Sanguszko (1842–1903)
 Leon Sapieha (1803–1878)
 Jan Sehn (1909–1965)
 Władysław Siemaszko (born 1919)
 Włodzimierz Spasowicz(1829–1906)
 Władysław Szczepkowski (born 1966)
 Wojciech Szczurek (born 1963)
 Stanisław Szenic (1904–1987)
 Jolanta Szymanek-Deresz (1954–2010)

T

 Władysław Tempka (1889–1940)
 Wojciech Trąmpczyński (1860–1953)

W

 Zofia Wasilkowska (1910–1996)
 Paweł Włodkowic (ca. 1370 – 1435)
 Helena Wolińska-Brus (1919–2008)
 Henryk Woliński (1901–1986)
 Tadeusz Wróblewski (1858–1925)
 Władysław Wróblewski (1875–1951)
 Seweryn Wysłouch (1900–1968)

Y
 Yeshayahu Yerushalmi (1920–1999)

Z

 Janusz Zabłocki (born 1926)
 Wacław Zagórski (1909–1982)
 Stanisław Zając (1949–2010)
 Bolesław Zajączkowski (1891–1920)
 Janina Zakrzewska (1928–1995)
 Andrzej Zakrzewski (1941–2000)
 Paweł Zaremba (1915–1979)
 Stanisław Zarakowski (1907–1998)
 Władysław Żeleński (1903–2006)
 Zbigniew Ziobro (born 1970)
 Andrzej Zoll (born 1942)
 Maria Zuchowicz (born 1930)

See also

 List of Polish people

References

External links
 

Law-related lists
Lawyers